Jess Thomas (August 4, 1927 – October 11, 1993) was an American operatic tenor, best known for singing Wagner compositions.

Biography

Jess Floyd Thomas was born in Hot Springs, South Dakota. As a child, he took part in various musical activities and studied psychology at the University of Nebraska. For several years, he worked as a high school guidance counselor, before enrolling at Stanford University for an MA. Learning that the operatic department was producing Verdi's Falstaff, he auditioned for Otto Schulmann, the vocal professor, and obtained the role of Fenton. Although by now 27 years old, Thomas decided to change careers and to become a singer. He studied with Schulmann for three years before his operatic debut in 1957. In 1958, he joined the Badisches Staatstheater in Karlsruhe, Germany. He was awarded the Wagner Medal at Bayreuth in 1963. His many appearances in North America and Europe between the late 1950s and early 1980s included fifteen seasons in 109 performances of fifteen roles at the Metropolitan Opera in New York City.

Thomas died in Tiburon, California in 1993, aged 66.

Operatic career
Thomas made his operatic debut in 1957 for the San Francisco Opera, performing in Richard Strauss's Der Rosenkavalier as the Haushofmeister. In 1958, he debuted in the title role of Richard Wagner's Lohengrin for the Karlsruhe Staatstheater at the commencement of a career in Germany.

It was at Bayreuth that he established his reputation as a Wagnerian tenor, performing in the following roles and operas:
 Parsifal 1961–63, 1965
 Lohengrin 1962, 1967
 Siegmund in Die Walküre (Bayreuth Festival on Tour in Osaka) 1967
 Walther in Die Meistersinger von Nürnberg 1963, 1969
 Tannhäuser 1966–67
 Siegfried 1969, 1976

In 1963, Thomas joined the roster of the Metropolitan Opera and went on to sing 109 performances of fifteen roles with the company, including all the major tenor roles of Wagner's work. Among the highlights of his career with the Met was appearing at the opening of the new Metropolitan Opera House at Lincoln Center, in the first performance of Samuel Barber's Antony and Cleopatra with Leontyne Price.

On December 9, 1981, San Francisco Opera general director Kurt Herbert Adler called Thomas an hour before a performance of Die Walküre. Heldentenor James King had lost his voice, and Adler asked Thomas if he would like to sing the role in an hour. "But I haven't even shaved yet", Thomas said. Though he hadn't looked at the score in years, Thomas performed the role at the age of 54, relying on a memory of the role, with some prompting. The next day, headlines proclaimed Thomas's eleventh-hour rescue for Die Walküre. Thomas's farewell performance took place in the title role of Parsifal with the Metropolitan Opera in 1982, while it was on tour in Washington, D.C.

In 1997, on request of Thomas's widow, Violeta Thomas, the Austrian sculptor Hortensia Fussy made a portrait of Jess Thomas, showing him as Siegfried with his sword. The sculpture was donated to the Austrian Theatre Museum in 2002.

References

External links
 Jess Thomas biography
 Obituary: Jess Thomas
 Obituary in The New York Times
 History of the Tenor / Jess Thomas / Sound clips and narration

1927 births
1993 deaths
People from Hot Springs, South Dakota
University of Nebraska–Lincoln alumni
American operatic tenors
Heldentenors
Singers from South Dakota
Classical musicians from South Dakota
20th-century American male opera singers